The Rhizobiaceae is a family of Pseudomonadota comprising multiple subgroups that enhance and hinder plant development. Some bacteria found in the family are used for plant nutrition and collectively make up the rhizobia. Other bacteria such as Agrobacterium tumefaciens and Rhizobium rhizogenes severely alter the development of plants in their ability to induce crown galls or hairy roots, respectively. The family has been of an interest to scientists for centuries in their ability to associate with plants and modify plant development. The Rhizobiaceae are, like all Pseudomonadota, Gram-negative. They are aerobic, and the cells are usually rod-shaped. Many species of the Rhizobiaceae are diazotrophs which are able to fix nitrogen and are symbiotic with plant roots.

Genera
Rhizobiaceae comprises the following genera:

 Agrobacterium Conn 1942 (Approved Lists 1980)
 Allorhizobium de Lajudie et al. 1998
 Ciceribacter Kathiravan et al. 2013

 Endobacterium Menéndez et al. 2021
 Ensifer Casida 1982
 Gellertiella Tóth et al. 2017
 Georhizobium Cao et al. 2020
 Hoeflea Peix et al. 2005
 Lentilitoribacter Park et al. 2013
 Liberibacter Fagen et al. 2014
 Martelella Rivas et al. 2005
 Mycoplana Gray and Thornton 1928 (Approved Lists 1980)
 "Neopararhizobium" Hördt et al. 2020
 Neorhizobium Mousavi et al. 2015
 "Onobrychidicola" Ashrafi et al. 2022
 Pararhizobium Mousavi et al. 2016
 Peteryoungia Rahi et al. 2021
 Pseudorhizobium Kimes et al. 2017
 Rhizobium Frank 1889 (Approved Lists 1980)
 Shinella An et al. 2006
 Sinorhizobium Chen et al. 1988
 Xaviernesmea Kuzmanović et al. 2022

Phylogeny
The currently accepted taxonomy is based on the List of Prokaryotic names with Standing in Nomenclature (LPSN). The phylogeny is based on whole-genome analysis.

References

 
Plant nutrition
Hyphomicrobiales